The Yeshiva of Greater Washington (YGW) is an Orthodox community-based Jewish Day School that is located in Silver Spring, Maryland. It was founded in 1964 by Rabbi Gedaliah Anemer. It consists of separate high schools for boys and girls and a beis medrash.

The Yeshiva of Greater Washington Boys Division

The Yeshiva Boys Division is for boys in grades 7 through 12, with a student body of approximately 145. The Yeshiva encourages its students to pursue a year of study in Yeshiva in Israel before attending college. In addition to the boys school, the Yeshiva has a girls division located in a separate building.

The Yeshiva College Of The Nation's Capital

The Yeshiva College Of The Nation's Capital program offers a nationally accredited Bachelor's in Talmudic Law. To earn this degree, a student must earn four years of Talmud study credits, two of which can be transferred from other accredited Yeshivos. University of Maryland Global Campus and the Yeshiva College have an exclusive articulation agreement and it is their primary college program. The program offers a full range of undergraduate degree programs with a schedule that allows the students to still learn a full 1st and 2nd seder in Yeshiva.

Curriculum
YGW's curriculum is split into two parts. One part is devoted to the general studies of math, science, English, computers, and history. The other part of the day consists of Judaic studies such as Gemara, which is focused on Chumash, Jewish Law, and Hebrew Language. The school offers three levels of high school courses, Regular, Honors, and A.P Classes, as well as a college preparatory program.

Faculty
The development department is led by Rabbi Binyamin Sanders, who assists the headmaster, Rabbi Yitzchok Merkin. The development coordinator is Mrs. Donna Goldman. The boys middle school and high school division is currently under the leadership of the Menahel, Rabbi Amram Hes. Rabbi Zvi Teitelbaum is the principal.

Rabbi Aaron Lopiansky is the Rosh Yeshiva of the Yeshiva Gedolah Division. Rabbi Eliezer Kreiser is the Mashgiach. Yitzchak Labell is the Executive Administrator of Yeshiva College of the Nation's Capital. Rabbi David Hyatt (1942-2022) is the Dean Emeritus.

Yeshiva has both Jewish and non-Jewish staff for their classes throughout the day.

Extra-curricular activities
The Yeshiva of Greater Washington has a robotics club, a public speaking club, Minyonaire Club, art club, science club and a Krav Maga club. They have a Junior Varsity basketball team and a varsity baseball team. During the fall season they play an intramural football competition called Yeshiva Football League. The school has a newspaper printed every quarter of the school year. Once a year they have a Shabbaton program for both the high school and the middle school. The past few years, the school has taken the seniors to Israel to tour and evaluate the schools for their upcoming year in Israel. In addition, the whole school takes a ski trip during the winter. The school has various committees, such as: the Chesed committee, the business committee, yearbook committee, and the trip committee. The school has a student council for each grade, and one president from the senior class.

Yeshiva Gedolah
The Yeshiva Gedolah of Greater Washington accepts Jewish students who are committed to making Torah the major focus of their formative years.

Students that attend the Yeshiva Gedolah have the option of receiving a four-year Bachelor of Talmudic Law. This degree has been accepted by various programs, and alumni have proceeded to gain access to graduate schools.

Other students study Torah with the Yeshiva during the day, and take separate college classes at night. The rabbis that assist the students with their studies are Rabbi Aaron Lopiansky, Rabbi Reingold, Rabbi Arzouan, Rabbi Weinberger, Rabbi Ginsberg, Rabbi Kesierer, and Rabbi Kreiser. The rabbinic staff provides a three "seder" yeshiva education and places emphasis on personalized interaction. The Yeshiva seeks to teach students to apply Torah knowledge in their daily lives.

During the COVID-19 Pandemic, the Yeshiva Gedolah relocated to the Camp Chaveirim campus in Fannettsburg, Pennsylvania, and later, along with Rabbi Lopiansky, to the Camp Shoresh campus in Adamstown, Maryland.  This created a "bubble", thus ensuring the safety of the student body. The Yeshiva required students to self-quarantine before coming, and all students were urged to vaccinate at the earliest opportunity. The Yeshiva moved back to Fannettsburg on the Sunday of June 13 at the termination of their rental of the Shoresh campus. Upon the commencement of the Fall semester, the Yeshiva renewed its lease on Camp Shoresh, with the goal of rejoining the High School on November 15. It was during that period of time that the Bochurim affixed the "Ezra at Shoresh" picture upon the wall with blue painters' tape. The Yeshiva Gedolah moved back to Silver Spring on the target date.

See also
 List of Jewish universities and colleges in the United States

References

1) http://www.yeshiva.edu/BOYSDIVISION/tabid/54/Default.aspx

2)http://washingtonjewishweek.com/main.asp?SectionID=4&SubSectionID=17&ArticleID=12656&TM=34178.68

3) http://www.jirs.org/jirs/jirs0024ao.html

4) http://www.yeshiva.edu/BOYSDIVISION/Activities/tabid/70/Default.aspx

5) http://www.yeshiva.edu/BOYSDIVISION/JudaicStudies/tabid/68/Default.aspx

6) https://www.vaadgw.org/rabbi-gedaliah-anemer.html

External links
 Website for The Yeshiva College Of The Nation's Capital

Jewish day schools in Maryland
Jews and Judaism in Silver Spring, Maryland
Kemp Mill, Maryland
Modern Orthodox Jewish day schools in the United States
Modern Orthodox Judaism in Maryland
Orthodox yeshivas in the United States
Private middle schools in Maryland
Private high schools in Maryland